In American football, passing, along with running (also referred to as rushing), is one of the two main methods of advancing the ball down the field. Passes are typically attempted by the quarterback, but any offensive player can attempt a pass provided they are behind the line of scrimmage. To qualify as a passing play, the ball must have initially moved forward after leaving the hands of the passer; if the ball initially moved laterally or backwards, the play would instead be considered a running play. A receiving touchdown is scored when a player catches the ball in the field of play and advances it into the end zone, or catches it while already being within the boundaries of the end zone.

The NFL did not begin keeping official records until the 1932 season. Since the adoption of the 14-game season in 1961, only one season (the strike-shortened 1982 season) has had a receiving touchdowns league leader record fewer than 10 touchdown catches. The record for receiving touchdowns in a season is 23, set by Randy Moss during the 2007 season; only one other player (Jerry Rice) has recorded 20 or more receiving touchdowns in a season. In addition to the overall National Football League (NFL) receiving touchdown leaders, league record books recognize the receiving touchdown leaders of the American Football League (AFL), which operated from 1960 to 1969 before being absorbed into the National Football League in 1970.

Don Hutson led the league in receiving touchdowns nine times, the most of any player in league history; Jerry Rice ranks second with six league-leading seasons. Hutson also holds the record for the two longest streaks leading the league in receiving touchdowns, doing so for four consecutive seasons (1935 to 1938) and then doing it for five consecutive years from 1940 to 1944. The next longest streak is three seasons, accomplished by Rice from 1989 to 1991. The Green Bay Packers have had a player from their team lead the league in receiving touchdowns 15 times, the most of any team in the NFL; the San Francisco 49ers rank second with 12.

NFL season receiving touchdowns leaders

Other receiving touchdowns leaders

See also
 List of National Football League career receiving touchdowns leaders

Notes
Notes

Footnotes

External links
 National Football League

American Football League
All-America Football Conference
Receiving
Receiving
National Football League lists